{{DISPLAYTITLE:vVO2max}}
vV̇O2max (velocity at maximal oxygen uptake) is an intense running or swimming pace. In a constant rate exercise, this is the minimum speed for which the organism's maximal oxygen uptake is reached (after a few minutes of exercise at this intensity) ; at higher paces, any additional increase in power is provided by anaerobic processes. In an incremental exercise, it is the first speed at which any increase in exercise intensity fails to elicit an increase in oxygen consumption. 

The vV̇O2max of world class middle- and long-distance runners may exceed  or 2:30/km pace ( or about 4:00/mile), making this speed slightly comparable to 3000 m race pace.

Training
Research by Véronique Billat has shown that training at vV̇O2max pace improves both V̇O2max and the economy required to maintain pace at this intensity. 

Training at vV̇O2max takes the form of interval workouts. For example,  with 3 minutes recovery between each repetition.

Determining vV̇O2max from VO2max 
The formula from Léger and Mercier links the V̇O2max to the vV̇O2max, supposing an ideal running technique. 

vV̇O2max = V̇O2max / 3.5
where vV̇O2max is in km/h and V̇O2max is in mL/(kg•min).

Note: This formula is identical to that used to calculate the Metabolic Equivalent of Task (MET) score for a given V̇O2max estimation.

See also 
Anaerobic exercise
High-intensity interval training
Lactate threshold
Respirometry
Running economy
Training effect

Metabolic equivalent
VDOT

References

Exercise physiology
Running